KBIT, Kbit or kbit may refer to:

Kilobit, 1000 bits
KBIT-LD, a low-power television station (channel 24, virtual 43) licensed to serve Monterey, California, United States
KBIT-LD (Chico, California), a defunct low-power television station (channel 50) formerly licensed to serve Chico, California
KBIT (IQ test)